was a town located in the former Shima District, Mie Prefecture, Japan.

As of 2003, the town had an estimated population of 14,075 and a density of 827.45 persons per km². The total area was 17.01 km².

On October 1, 2004, Shima absorbed the towns of Ago, Daiō, Hamajima and Isobe (all from Shima District) to create the city of Shima.

External links
 Official website of the city of Shima 

Dissolved municipalities of Mie Prefecture